Teracotona alicia is a moth in the family Erebidae. It was described by George Hampson in 1911. It is found in Kenya.

References

Endemic moths of Kenya
Moths described in 1911
Spilosomina